The Theatre Museum (TTM) is located at 30 Worth Street in Manhattan, New York City. Its mission is to preserve, protect and perpetuate the legacy of theatre, including Broadway theatre. The Theatre Museum continues the legacy of The Broadway Theatre Institute begun in 1995 by presenting Awards for Excellence in Theatre History Preservation and Theatre Arts Education. It currently functioning as a museum-at-large and is not open to the public.

History
From 1986 – 2003, the Broadway Theatre Institute developed programs that fostered the appreciation of theatre in New York and served more than 100,000 school children and adults in New York City. It merged with the Theatre Museum in 2003.

Activities
In 2007, the annual Awards for Excellence Ceremony honored actress Ellen Burstyn, The New York Times Chief Theater Critic Ben Brantley, actor, dancer and choreographer Carmen de Lavallade, and Arts Horizons, an institution that uses professional performers to foster creativity in students.

The Theatre Museum has mounted exhibitions in New York throughout the year celebrating the history of the theatre, but none in a long time.  Exhibitions included the architecture of the historic Times Square theatres, and the history of the American showboat, which brought entertainment on adapted barges along rivers throughout the country.

The showboat exhibition display in Red Hook, Brooklyn until May 2008 included panels displaying images of showboats, Playbills, programs, production photographs and written descriptions, artifacts, oral histories of those who lived on these entertainment barges, video clips, a painted scrim, and a calliope on performance days.

The Theatre Museum has a photo collection of historic Broadway shows, which was donated by board member Basil Hero, president of Broadway Digital Entertainment, a pioneer in preserving Broadway’s greatest masterpieces.

Board
The founding members of The Theatre Museum in 2003 were Helen Marie Guditis, Tony Award winning producer Stewart F. Lane, Richard F. Bernstein, Esq, Linda B. Leff and William Rappaport.

Ms. Guditis sat on Manhattan Community Board 5 and represented that board on the Times Square Alliance Board of Directors, which serves the Theater District in New York City. She has also served on the board of directors of the League of Professional Theatre Women and the New York Women’s Agenda.

The Theatre Museum’s board of trustees included Stewart F. Lane, Helen Marie Guditis, George Thomas, William Walters, James Heinze and Basil Hero.

Mr. Lane is a writer, director and producer whose credits include Fiddler on the Roof, Thoroughly Modern Millie and La Cage aux Folles, which won him his first Tony Award at the age of 33. Mr. Hero has been cited in The New York Times for his work with PBS to digitally preserve such masterpieces as the original Death of a Salesman with Lee J. Cobb and The Iceman Cometh with Jason Robards.   William Walters is a VP of Theatrical Stage Workers Local One I.A.T.S.E.

Award recipients
1995
Jujamcyn Theaters - Theatre History Preservation
Dr. Mary Henderson - Theatre Arts Education

1997
The Empire State Development Fund - Theatre History Preservation
The Theatre Development Fund - Theatre Arts Education
Gwen Verdon - Lifetime Achievement

1999
George Mason University - Theatre History Preservation
American Theater Wing - Theatre Arts Education
Celeste Holm - Distinguished Contributor to the Theatre
Mortimer Becker - Lifetime Achievement

2000
Harvard Theatre Collection - Theatre History Preservation
New York University - Theatre Arts Education
The Drama Book Shop - Distinguished Service to the Theatre
Tharon Musser - Lifetime Achievement
Honoring 100th Anniversary of The Shubert Organization - Special Award

2002
The Theatre Historical Society of America - Theatre History Preservation
The Paper Bag Players - Theatre Arts Education
New York City Police Department and New York City Fire Department - Distinguished Service to the Theatre
Tony Walton - Lifetime Achievement
Richard Rogers in Celebration of his 100th Birthday - Special Award

2003
The Players - Theatre History Preservation
The BMI- Lehman Engel Musical Theatre Workshop - Theatre Arts Education
Materials for the Arts - Distinguished Service to the Theatre
John Willis - Lifetime Achievement
St. Malachy's-The Actors' Chapel's 100th Anniversary - Special Award

2004
Dodger Costumes - Theatre History Preservation
F.H. LaGuardia High School of Music & Art and Performing Arts - Theatre Arts Education
The Princess Grace Foundation USA - Distinguished Service to the Theatre
Betty Comden - Lifetime Achievement
Commemorating the 100th Anniversary of Times Square - Special Award

2005
Laurence Maslon and Michael Kantor for their PBS Broadway Series - Theatre History Preservation
Periwinlkle Productionsand Ten Chimney's Foundation - Theatre Arts Education

2006
Fred Papert and The Manhattan Theatre Club - Theatre History Preservation
Lundeana M. Thomas Ph. D and The Drama League Directors Project - Theatre Arts Education

2007
Ben Brantley - Theatre History Preservation
Carmen de Lavallade and Arts Horizons - Theatre Arts Education
Ellen Burstyn - Lifetime Achievement

2008
Five Towns College - Theatre Arts Education
Ricky McKay - Individual Theatre History Preservation
The Theatre Museum of Repertoire America - Organization Theatre History Preservation
Joe Franklin - Lifetime Achievement

2010
The Mint Theatre Company – Theatre History Preservation
Samuel French, Inc. – Theatre Arts Education
Richard M. Sherman and Robert B. Sherman – Career Achievement

2011
Frank Cullen – Theatre History Preservation
Frank Sinatra High School for the Arts – Theatre Arts Education
Sheldon Harnick – Career Achievement
Bonnie Comley – Distinguished Service to the Theatre

2012
Don B. Wilmeth – Theatre History Preservation
Stagedoor Manor – Theatre Arts Education
Fred Olsson – Career Achievement
Theatre Communications Group – Distinguished Service to the Theatre

2013
Emerson College – Theatre Arts Education
Helen M. Guditis – Distinguished Service to the Theatre
100th Anniversary of The Palace Theatre - Special Award

2014
Fathom Events - Theatre History Preservation
BroadwayWorld - Theatre Arts Education
100th Anniversary of The Marx Brothers - Special Award

External links
 Official site

References

Museums established in 2003
Museums in Manhattan
Theatre museums in the United States
2003 establishments in New York City